The Lithuanian Football Cup 2000–01 was the 12th season of the Lithuanian annual football tournament. The competition started on 18 March 2000 with the First Round games and ended on 19 May 2001 with the Final. The defending champions were FK Ekranas.

First round

| colspan="3" style="background:#9cc;"|18 March 2000

|}

Quarter finals

First legs

Second legs

FK Nevėžis won 3–1 on aggregate

FK Atlantas won 2–1 on aggregate

FK Žalgiris won 5–0 on aggregate

FBK Kaunas won 13–1 on aggregate

Semifinals

First legs

Second legs

FK Žalgiris won 6–1 on aggregate

2–2 on aggregate, FK Atlantas win on away goals

Final

External links
 RSSSF page

Cup
Cup
Lithuanian Football Cup, 2000-01
Lithuanian Football Cup seasons